Chrysiogenes arsenatis is a species of bacterium in the family Chrysiogenaceae. It has a unique biochemistry. Instead of respiring with oxygen, it respires using the most oxidized form of arsenic, arsenate. It uses arsenate as its terminal electron acceptor. Arsenic is usually toxic to life. Bacteria like Chrysiogenes arsenatis are found in anoxic arsenic-contaminated environments.

References

External links
Type strain of Chrysiogenes arsenatis at BacDive -  the Bacterial Diversity Metadatabase

Chrysiogenetes
Bacteria described in 1996